Who Are You? is the second extended play by South Korean singer Kahi. It was released on October 10, 2013.

Background
In late September, it was speculated that Kahi will be making her long-awaited comeback in mid October. On September 27, Pledis Entertainment confirmed the reports and announced that Kahi will be releasing her second mini album, titled "Who Are You?", on October 10. Over the next few days, teasers were released promoting the comeback. The track list was later revealed and featured artists such as Dumbfoundead, Dok2 and ex-After School member, Bekah.

Track listing

Release and promotion
Following the release of the album, Kahi made her "comeback stage" on Mnet's M! Countdown where she performed the lead single, "It's ME". To promote the album, Kahi will perform on Korean music shows M! Countdown, Music Core, Inkigayo and Show Champion on a weekly basis. Kahi will not be promoting on Music Bank due to conflicts between the broadcast company, KBS, and Pledis Entertainment.

Chart performance
Upon release, the song ranked high on music charts and maintained a strong position within the top 20 for several days.

Single chart

Album chart

Sales and certifications

Release history

References

2013 EPs
Korean-language EPs
Kakao M EPs